Shelley Holroyd (born 17 May 1973 in Salford, Lancashire, England) is a female British former javelin thrower.

Athletics career
Holroyd was the sixth British javelin thrower to throw over 60 metres (1993) and the first thrower to reach an Olympic Games since Tessa Sanderson. At the age of 23 she had already competed in every major championship. She started throwing at the age of 12 and at 13 threw 37m58cm to win the English Schools Championships. At the age of 16 Holroyd threw 52m50 and became a senior international athlete. In 1992 she broke the English Schools record with 56m50 and it is still the longest throw in the history of the English Schools female javelin. Later that year Holroyd was picked for the GB Junior team and subsequently came fourth at the World Junior Championships (1992) and was ranked Britain's number one thrower. In 1993 Holroyd threw 60m10cm to win the World Championship Trials and qualified for the World Championships, Stuttgart.

In March 1995 Holroyd was involved in a car accident that was deemed to be the end of her throwing career but she overcame her injuries to start training in July the same year. In December she was involved in a freak training accident and broke her right elbow. Once again the injury threatened her career. February 1996 saw Holroyd come back from her injury and in July 1996 she qualified for the 1996 Great Britain Olympic team.

At the 1997 World Championships in Athens Holroyd became ill during the competition after having an allergic reaction to an injection and had to pull out. It was another year plagued with injuries. She represented England in the javelin, at the 1998 Commonwealth Games in Kuala Lumpur, Malaysia. Eight years later she competed in the javelin again at the 2006 Commonwealth Games.

After a 17-year spell as an international athlete Holroyd retired in 2006 due to injury and moved into coaching.

Achievements

1989 European Junior Championships (Varaždin, Yugoslavia)
1991 European Junior Championships (Thessaloniki, Greece) 7th
1994 Commonwealth Games (Victoria, British Columbia, Canada) Withdrew due to illness
1997 World Championships (Athens, Greece)
1998 Commonwealth Games (Kuala Lumpur, Malaysia) 5th
2006 Commonwealth Games (Melbourne, Australia) 10th

Domestic championships
English Schools Champion 1986, 1991, 1992
North of England Champion 1991, 1992, 1993, 2005
UK Championships 1989 3rd, 1992 2nd, 1997 2nd
AAAs Champion 1993, 1994 2nd in 1996, 1998, 2005 3rd in 2000, 2004

Personal life

References

External links
 Official website

 GB Athletics Top Performers 1980–2005

1973 births
Living people
Sportspeople from Salford
British female javelin throwers
English female javelin throwers
Olympic athletes of Great Britain
Athletes (track and field) at the 1996 Summer Olympics
Commonwealth Games competitors for England
Athletes (track and field) at the 1998 Commonwealth Games
Athletes (track and field) at the 2006 Commonwealth Games
World Athletics Championships athletes for Great Britain